This is a list of the teams which took part at the 1972 Rugby League World Cup.

Australia
Coach: Harry Bath
Graeme Langlands (c) fullback from St. George
Arthur Beetson, prop/second row forward from Eastern Suburbs
Ray Branighan, centre/wing from Manly-Warringah
Bob Fulton, five-eight/centre form Manly-Warringah
John Elford, second row forward from Western Suburbs
John Grant, centre/wing/fullback from South Brisbane
Mark Harris, centre/wing from Eastern Suburbs
Fred Jones, hooker from Manly-Warringah
Stephen Knight, centre/wing from Western Suburbs
Bob McCarthy, second row forward from South Sydney
John O'Neill, prop-forward from Manly-Warringah
Bob O'Reilly, prop forward from Parramatta
Tommy Raudonikis, half-back from Western Suburbs
Paul Sait, centre/lock/second row from South Sydney
Geoff Starling, centre/wing/fullback from Balmain
Gary Stevens, second row forward from South Sydney
Gary Sullivan, lock forward from Newtown
Dennis Ward, half-back from Manly-Warringah
Elwyn Walters, hooker from South Sydney

France
Initially called up as a starting member playing as back, Maurice de Matos was replaced by Raymond Toujas due to an injury before the tournament.
Coach:Antoine Jimenez

Francis de Nadai (c) (Limoux)
Michel Anglade (Saint-Gaudens)
Élie Bonal (Carcassionne)
Jean-Marie Bonal (Carcassonne)
Jacques Franc (Saint-Jacques)
Marius Frattini (Cavaillon)
Jacques Garzino (Avignon)
Serge Gleyzes (Carcassonne)
Bernard Guilhem (Carcassonne)
Jean-Marie Imbert (Avignon)
Serge Marsolan (Saint-Gaudens)
Michel Mazaré (Villeneuve-sur-Lot)
Michel Molinier (Saint-Gaudens)
Guy Rodriguez (Toulouse)
André Ruiz (Carcassonne)
Jean-Paul Sauret (Villefranche)
Victor Serrano (Saint-Gaudens)
Raymond Toujas (Carcassonne)
Charles Zalduendo (Toulouse)

Great Britain 
Coach: Jim Challinor

Clive Sullivan (c), wing from Hull
John Atkinson, wing from Leeds
Paul Charlton, fullback from Salford
Terry Clawson, prop/second row forward from Leeds
Colin Dixon, second row/loose forward from Salford
Chris Hesketh, centre/stand-off from Salford
John Holmes, stand-off from Leeds
Robert Irving, second row forward from Oldham
David Jeanes, prop forward from Leeds
Tony Karalius, hooker from St. Helens
Brian Lockwood, second row forward from Castleford
Phil Lowe, second row forward from Hull Kingston Rovers
Steve Nash, scrum half from Featherstone Rovers
George Nicholls, loose forward from Widnes
Dennis O'Neill, stand-off from Widnes
David Redfearn, wing from Bradford Northern
Mike Stephenson, hooker from Dewsbury
John Walsh, utility back from St. Helens

New Zealand
Coach:Des Barchard
Roy Christian (c)
Mocky Brereton
Bill Burgoyne 
Tony Coll
Warren Collicoat  
Graeme Cooksley  
Murray Eade  
Doug Gailey  
Peter Gurnick  
Don Mann
Mita Mohi
John O'Sullivan 
Phillip Orchard 
Bob Paul
Brian Tracey
Rodney Walker
John Whittaker
Dennis Williams 
John Wilson

External links
World Cup 1972 at Rugby League Project

1972 in rugby league
Rugby League World Cup squads